JS Inazuma (DD-105) is the fifth ship of s. She was commissioned on 15 March 2000.

Design
The hull design was completely renovated from first-generation destroyers. In addition to increasing the size in order to reduce the underwater radiation noise, both the superstructure and hull were inclined to reduce the radar cross-section. However, there is no angled tripod mainmast like the one of the American  because of the heavy weather of the Sea of Japan in winter. Destroyers built under the First Defense Build-up Plan, including the former , adopted a unique long forecastle style called "Oranda-zaka".

The engine arrangement is COGAG as same as Asagiri class, but a pair of engines were updated to Spey SM1C. The remaining one pair were replaced by LM2500, same as in the Kongō class.

Construction and career
Inazuma was laid down on 8 May 1997 by Mitsubishi Heavy Industries at Nagasaki as part of the 1995 plan and launched on 9 September 1998. Commissioned on 15 March 2000, the destroyer was incorporated into the 4th Escort Corps and deployed to Kure.

On 13 September, she joined the submarine  in the South China Sea and conducted anti-submarine warfare training. On 26 September, a joint training between Japan and the United Kingdom was conducted with  heading for the South China Sea with Kaga in the sea and airspace west of Sumatra.

On 21 May 2019, she departed for the "Reiwa first year pelagic practice voyage" with the training ship JS Kashima. The vessels visited 13 ports in 11 countries in 157 days with about 580 people, including about 190 people who completed the 69th General Executive Candidate Course (including 1 ensign of the Royal Thai Navy), in Yokosuka on 24 October.

Inazuma left Innoshima, Onomichi in the morning of 10 January 2023 for sea acceptance trial after undergoing routine maintenance at Japan Marine United shipyard in Innoshima. The incident caused an oil spill and disabled Inazumas propulsion and steering. The destroyer then dropped anchor at its current position. The sailors aboard Inazuma threw absorbent pads from the stern to sop up the leaked oil, which stretched up to  behind the ship and covered an area of approximately 10,000 square feet at the day of incident. On 15 January at 08:00, Inazuma was towed by two tugboats from its anchorage and arrived off the coast of Innoshima at 17:00. The ship was scheduled to enter Innoshima shipyard on the next day.

Gallery

Citations

References 

 
 
 Saunders, Stephen. IHS Jane's Fighting Ships 2013-2014. Jane's Information Group (2003). 

1998 ships
Murasame-class destroyers (1994)
Ships built by Mitsubishi Heavy Industries